Twenty Two Hundred is an Australian rock band from Melbourne, Victoria, who formed in 2010. The band was founded by songwriter, musician and producer Mark Wells (former member of The Ronnie Wood Band). Their music incorporates elements of hard rock, classic rock, funk and groove.

In April 2010, the band released their debut EP, Eleven.

Twenty Two Hundred were personally invited by Slash to open for his concert at Fort Canning Park, Singapore on 2 August 2010 as part of the Slash 2010 World Tour. American rock band Coheed and Cambria also performed.
Twenty Two Hundred consequently opened for Slash in Singapore, Japan, Korea and Hong Kong from 14 to 22 March 2011.

Following the Slash tour, the band recruited vocalist Tony Cardenas-Montana (of Slash and Great White) to feature on their debut album.

Twenty Two Hundred recorded their debut album Carnaval De Vénus in Melbourne and Los Angeles in 2012. The album was produced by Mark Wells and mixed by Grammy award-winning mix engineer Andrew Scheps, who also signed the band to his label Tonequake Records. The album was released on Tonequake Records on 19 February 2013.

Twenty Two Hundred opened for Slash ft Myles Kennedy & The Conspirators, and California Breed on the Slash World of Fire UK tour in November/December 2014. They opened for 5 arena shows in Manchester, Leeds, Birmingham, London (Wembley Arena) and Glasgow.

Band members
 Tony Cardenas-Montana – lead vocals
 Mark Wells – bass, guitar, vocals
 Marcus Kain – guitar
 Drew Alig – drums

Past members
 Ben Lawoko-Leaney (2010–2011)

Discography
 Carnaval De Vénus (LP), Tonequake Records (2013)
 Eleven (EP), independent (2010)

References

External links
 Official homepage
 Tonequake Records homepage

Australian rock music groups